The Edmund Burke Foundation (Edmund Burke Stichting) is a conservative group based in The Hague, the Netherlands.

History
The Edmund Burke Foundation was founded in 2000 by a group of young conservatives, including professor Andreas Kinneging and journalist Bart Jan Spruyt, unsatisfied with the consensus of Dutch politics, the level of public debate and what they believe is the dangerous drift of philosophy and culture in the Netherlands. It is named after the 18th-century conservative philosopher Edmund Burke.

From 2000 to 2005, the Foundation was active as both a think-tank and an educational group. In that time, the foundation took positions that are both fiscally and socially conservative. It organized an annual summer school for undergraduate students, conferences, seminars and lectures on topics such as the multicultural society, education, health care, foreign policy and defense. Conservatives associated with the Foundation were, for example, in favor of health care privatization and tax cuts. The Foundation has links with conservative thinktanks in the US, such as the Heritage Foundation and the American Enterprise Institute. Speakers at the foundation's events included Roger Scruton, the Burke scholar Peter Stanlis, Dutch writer Leon de Winter, Islam-expert Reuel Marc Gerecht, Frits Bolkestein and Onno Ruding, former finance minister of The Netherlands.

In the summer of 2005, the Board of the Foundation decided to focus its activities more exclusively on its educational, cultural and philosophical programs, taking the Intercollegiate Studies Institute explicitly as a role model. Consequently, Bart Jan Spruyt stepped back as full-time managing director of the think-tank to join the political party of Geert Wilders, but remained a member of the governing Board of the Foundation. Several former employees then spun off the think-tank activities into a new group called the European Independent Institute.

Media activities
In its think tank period, the Burke Foundation regularly published reports and studies on a variety of topics, including the Dutch health care sector, privatization, wasteful government spending and conservative philosophy and thought. Members of the Burke Foundation published articles and op-eds in numerous newspapers, and many newspapers devoted substantial attention to the activities of the Foundation. Those newspapers include De Telegraaf, de Volkskrant, NRC Handelsblad, Het Parool, Trouw, Nederlands Dagblad, and weekly magazines such as HP/De Tijd, Elsevier, and De Groene Amsterdammer. Members of the Burke Foundation also appeared regularly on TV and Radio programs, including NOVA, Den Haag Vandaag, TweeVandaag, and the Radio 1 News program.

Funding
The Foundation received substantial support during its think-tank period from a variety of sources, including small private donors, Dutch entrepreneurs, and various multinational corporations, such as Pfizer and Microsoft.

References

External links
  (in Dutch)

2000 establishments in the Netherlands
Think tanks established in 2000
Think tanks based in the Netherlands
Political and economic think tanks based in the European Union
Organisations based in The Hague
Conservatism in the Netherlands
Political and economic research foundations
Political organisations based in the Netherlands
Edmund Burke